Protammodytes is a genus of sand lances found in the Atlantic and Pacific oceans.

Species
There are currently 3 recognized species in this genus:
 Protammodytes brachistos H. Ida, Sirimontaporn & Monkolprasit, 1994
 Protammodytes sarisa C. R. Robins & J. E. Böhlke, 1970
 Protammodytes ventrolineatus J. E. Randall & H. Ida, 2014

References

Ammodytidae
Marine fish genera